Samartindianes (Spanish: Anes, officially: Anes/Samartindianes) is a parish (administrative division) in Siero, a municipality within the province and autonomous community of Asturias, in northern Spain.  

The postal code is 33189.

Villages and hamlets

References

Parishes in Siero